Sheep Creek is a stream in the U.S. state of South Dakota. It is a tributary of the South Fork Grand River.

Sheep Creek was named for the fact sheep grazed near it.

See also
List of rivers of South Dakota

References

Rivers of Harding County, South Dakota
Rivers of South Dakota